Morgan Adams may refer to:

 Morgan Adams (Cutthroat Island), the main character in the film Cutthroat Island
 Morgan Adams (sailor) (1915–2004), American sailor